Letterbreckaun is one of the Maumturk Mountains of Connemara in County Galway, Ireland. At , it is the second-tallest of the Maumturks, the 129th–highest peak in Ireland on the Arderin list, and 159th–highest on the Vandeleur-Lynam list.  Letterbreckaun is in the middle sector of the long north-west to south-east spine of the Maumturks.

Naming
Saint Brecan is a saint associated with Galway county, and is said to be the successor to Saint Enda of Aran.

Geography
Letterbreckaun lies at the northern end of the central sector, of the long north-west to south-east central spine of the Maumturks range, in the Connemara National Park; when viewed from the west, the peak has a distinctive "pyramidal" shape, in contrast to the rounded shapes of the neighbouring peaks.

To the north of Letterbreckaun is the subsidiary summit of Letterbreckaun NE Top , whose prominence of  qualifies it as an Arderin Beg.  Further north, the slopes of Letterbreckaun drop into the sharp and steep "v-shaped" col of Maam Turk (meaning "pass of the boar"), from which the entire range bears its name.  Paul Tempan notes that the "holy well" marked on the OS maps at Maam Turk was noted by Irish historian Ruaidhrí Ó Flaithbheartaigh in 1684, saying: "There is a well in memorie of St. Fechin at Mam-tuirk".  Further north from the col of Maam Turk is the minor peak of Maumturkmore, which then crosses the "Col of Despondency" to the grassy sandstone and siltstone massif of Leenaun Hill.

Letterbreckaun's  prominence of  qualifies it as a Marilyn, and it also ranks it as the 82nd-highest mountain in Ireland on the MountainViews Online Database, 100 Highest Irish Mountains, where the minimum prominence threshold is 100 metres.

Hill walking
The easiest way summit Letterbreckaun is a 6-kilometre 2-3-hour route via the pass of Maam Turk; however, because of its positioning on the high rocky central spine of the central Maumturk range, it is also summited in a longer 14-kilometre 5–6 hour loop-route starting at the col of Maumahoge in the south, climbing Knocknahillion and then along a winding 2-kilometre rocky ridge to the top of Letterbreckaun, before descending via the "v-shaped" col of Maam Turk.

Letterbreckaun is also climbed as part of the Maamturks Challenge, a 25-kilometre 10–12 hour walk over the full Maumturks range (from Maam Cross to Leenaun), which is considered one of the "great classic ridge-walks of Ireland", but of "extreme grade" due to the circa 7,600 feet of total ascent.

Since 1975, the University College Galway Mountaineering Club, has run the annual "Maamturks Challenge Walk" (MCW), and man a checkpoint on the summit of Letterbreckaun.

Gallery

Bibliography

See also

Twelve Bens, major range in Connemara
Mweelrea, major range in Killary Harbour
Lists of mountains in Ireland
Lists of mountains and hills in the British Isles
List of Marilyns in the British Isles
List of Hewitt mountains in England, Wales and Ireland

References

External links
The Maamturks Challenge, University College Galway Mountaineering Club
The Maamturks Challenge: Routecard (2015)
MountainViews: The Irish Mountain Website, Letterbreckaun
MountainViews: Irish Online Mountain Database
The Database of British and Irish Hills , the largest database of British Isles mountains ("DoBIH")
Hill Bagging UK & Ireland, the searchable interface for the DoBIH

Marilyns of Ireland
Hewitts of Ireland
Mountains and hills of County Galway
Mountains under 1000 metres